Membrane glycoproteins are membrane proteins which play important roles in cell recognition.

Examples include:
 Fibronectin
 Laminin
 Osteonectin

See also
 Glycocalyx

External links

 
Glycoproteins